Eomakhaira is an extinct genus of thylacosmilid sparassodont known from the Oligocene Abanico Formation of Chile. It contains a single species, Eomakhaira molossus.

References 

Sparassodonts
Prehistoric mammal genera